Jeffrey Scott Sigafoos is a New Zealand professor of educational psychology.

After a PhD from the University of Minnesota, Sigafoos has held roles at University of Queensland, University of Sydney, and the University of Texas at Austin. He is currently a professor at Victoria University of Wellington  and an adjunct professor at James Madison University.

Sigafoos has been editor-in-chief of the journals Evidence-based Communication Assessment and Developmental Neurorehabilitation.
In 2015, Sigafoos was implicated in a scandal involving Johnny Matson and another two academic journals, Research in Developmental Disabilities and Research in Autism Spectrum Disorders, according to which Matson allegedly accepted papers by a select group of authors including himself and Sigafoos for publication in these journals without first sending them out for peer review.

Selected works
 Challenging behavior and developmental disability 
 Technology and teaching
 One-to-one training : instructional procedures for learners with developmental disabilities
 Implementing augmentative and alternative communication : strategies for learners with severe disabilities

References

External links
 google scholar 
 institutional homepage

Educational psychologists
University of Minnesota alumni
Academic staff of the Victoria University of Wellington
James Madison University faculty
Academic staff of the University of Queensland
Academic staff of the University of Sydney
University of Texas at Austin faculty
Living people
Year of birth missing (living people)